The 1940–41 season was the 2nd season of wartime football by Rangers.

Results
All results are written with Rangers' score first.

Southern League

Southern League Cup

Summer Cup

See also
 1940–41 in Scottish football
 1940–41 Southern League Cup (Scotland)

Rangers F.C. seasons
Rangers
Scottish football championship-winning seasons